Channel number may refer to:
 A television channel number
 Virtual channel numbers, as used on digital television systems
 Wireless LAN channel numbers, see list of WLAN channels
 Absolute radio-frequency channel number for GSM cellular networks

See also
 Pan-American television frequencies
 European cable television frequencies
 Australian and New Zealand television frequencies
 List of channel numbers assigned to FM frequencies in North America